The 2013–14 Southern Counties East Football League season (known as the 2013–14 Hurliman Southern Counties East Football League for sponsorship reasons) was the 48th in the history of Kent Football League renamed the Southern Counties East Football League a football competition in England. In 2013 the league changed its name to the Southern Counties East Football League, to reflect the fact that many of its member clubs no longer played within the county boundaries of Kent.

League table

The league consisted of 15 clubs from the previous season along with two new clubs, promoted from the Kent Invicta League:
Ashford United
Phoenix Sports

League table

Results

Stadia and locations

References
 Southern Counties East League AGM 2013

External links
 Southern Counties East Football League Official Website

2013–14
9